Grug is an Australian fictional character appearing in a series of children's books by the author Ted Prior. They were published between 1979 and 1992 by Hodder & Stoughton, Australia and have now been republished by Simon & Schuster, Australia from 1 June 2009. Three new books have also been published since 1992. 

Grug began his life as the top of a Burrawang tree (Macrozamia communis) that looks more like a Grass tree (Xanthorrhoea). Resembling a small, striped haystack with a face, he is fascinated by the world around him and solves everyday problems creatively and without fuss. When dancing instructions are too difficult to understand, Grug invents his own dance and calls it "The Grug".

Theatre productions
Grug has spawned two plays, Grug which "centers on the fun of visual surprise." and Grug and the Rainbow based on several of the books and "amongst the best children's theatre you will find".

Published works (partial list)
Grug (1979)  + (2009) 
Grug and the Big Red Apple (1979)  + (2009) 
Grug and the Green Paint (1979)  + (2009) 
Grug and his Garden (1979)  + (2009) 
Grug in the Playground (1982)  + (2009) 
Grug Meets Snoot (1982)  + (2009) 
Grug and the Rainbow (1982)  + (2009) 
Grug Learns to Swim (1982)  + (2009) 
Grug has a Birthday (1983)  + (2009) 
Grug Goes Fishing (1983)  + (2009) 
Grug at the Beach (1983)  + (2009) 
Grug Goes to School (1983)  + (2009) 
Grug's Word Book (1984) 
Grug at the Zoo (1985)  + (2009) 
Grug and his Bicycle (1985)  + (2009) 
Grug at the Snow (1985)  + (2009) 
Grug Plays Soccer (1985)  + (2009) 
Grug Plays Cricket (1989)  + (2009) 
Grug Learns to Cook (1989)  + (2009) 
Grug and his Music (1989)  + (2009) 
Grug Builds a Car (1989)  + (2009) 
Grug Builds a Boat (1992) + (2009) 
Grug and his Kite (1992)  + (2009) 
Grug Learns to Dance (1992)  + (2009) 
Grug Goes Shopping (1992)  + (2009) 
Grug meets a Dinosaur (2015) 
Grug and His First Easter (2016) 
Grug and the Bushfire (2020)

References

External links
www.Grug.com.au: Grug animation

Series of children's books
Characters in children's literature